Gordon E. Rogers (born December 22, 1964) is an American politician. He is a Republican representing the 21st district in the Rhode Island State Senate.

Biography

Rogers grew up in Foster, Rhode Island. He and his wife, Heidi, have four children and live in Foster.

Political career

Rogers was elected to three terms on the Foster Town Council, in 2010, 2014, and 2016.

Rogers announced his candidacy for the District 21 seat in the Rhode Island State Senate in February 2018, following the resignation of the 21st district's former senator, Nicholas Kettle. His lone opponent in the Republican primary, Julie Lamin, was disqualified from the race. In the general election, Rogers faced Michael Fine, an independent candidate, and James Safford, a Democrat; Rogers won the three-way race with 42.5% of the vote.

Rogers sits on the following Senate committees:
 Environment & Agriculture
 Housing & Municipal Government
 Rules, Government Ethics & Oversight

Electoral record

References

Living people
Republican Party Rhode Island state senators
1964 births
People from Foster, Rhode Island
21st-century American politicians